Kesmun (also Romanized as Kesmūn; also known as Gesmān and Kesmān) is a village in Saadatabad Rural District, Pariz District, Sirjan County, Kerman Province, Iran. At the 2006 census, its population was 17, in 6 families.

References 

Populated places in Sirjan County